Robert Hungerford may refer to:

Robert Hungerford, 2nd Baron Hungerford (1409–1459), the second but eldest surviving son of Walter, Lord Hungerford
Robert Hungerford, 3rd Baron Hungerford (1431–1464)
Robert Hungerford (MP for Calne), in 1553, MP for Calne (UK Parliament constituency)